Henri Yrissou (May 15, 1909 - June 21, 2009) was a French World War II veteran and politician. He served as a member of the National Assembly and as the mayor of Gaillac.

Early life
Henri Yrissou was born in Nîmes, France on May 15, 1909. During World War II, he joined the French Resistance and consequently received the Resistance Medal; he also received the Croix de Guerre and became a Commander of the Legion of Honour. Additionally, he became a Commander of the Veterans of Foreign Wars.

Career
Yrissou was Public Works and Foreign Affairs Minister Antoine Pinay's chief of staff from 1950 to 1955. He then served as a member of the National Assembly from November 30, 1958 to October 9, 1962, representing Tarn. He also served as the mayor of Gaillac from 1959 to 1977. As mayor, he oversaw the construction of the sewage system and lured a plastics factory to create jobs.

Death
Yrissou died on June 21, 2009.

References

1909 births
2009 deaths
People from Nîmes
Politicians from Occitania (administrative region)
National Centre of Independents and Peasants politicians
Deputies of the 1st National Assembly of the French Fifth Republic
Mayors of places in Occitania (administrative region)
Commandeurs of the Légion d'honneur
Recipients of the Resistance Medal
Recipients of the Croix de Guerre 1939–1945 (France)